David Meece (born May 26, 1952) is an American contemporary Christian musician who enjoyed success in the mid-1980s, and into the early 2010s, with more than thirty Top 10 hits including several No. 1 songs.

In November 2012, Meece was given a Lifetime Achievement Award for his body of work by the Artists Music Guild.

Early life and education 
Meece was raised in Humble, Texas, with an abusive and alcoholic father. Meece found solace in playing piano, and by his mid-teens he was touring in Europe and the US. 

Meece went on to study music at the Peabody Conservatory of Music where he met his wife Debbie, who played viola. While attending Baltimore's Peabody Institute, he experienced a religious conversion, and devoted his life to Jesus. 

Meece became a youth pastor, and began writing songs reflecting his Christian beliefs, adding classical influences to pop melodies.

Music career 
Meece came to the attention of the Christian music label Myrrh Records, and in 1976 they released his debut album, David. Meece would release ten albums between 1976 and 1993, becoming a major figure in the Christian music industry. Meece is perhaps best known for his song "We Are the Reason", which has been recorded by more than 200 other artists, and sung in several languages. His song "Seventy Times Seven" peaked at No. 77 on the Australian Charts. Meece worked with Canadian songwriter and producer Gino Vannelli for his albums Chronology and Candle In the Rain.

Possibly due to his conservatory training, Meece uses pieces of classical piano works as intros or settings for many of his songs. For example, in the song "This Time" from the album Learning to Trust, the opening section of the song (as well as the bridge and ending tag) is from Frédéric Chopin's "Revolutionary Etude" (Op. 10, No. 12) in C minor. The introductory melody for "You Can Go", from the album 7, is taken from the Two-Part Invention No. 13 in A Minor (BWV 784) by Johann Sebastian Bach. Because of the prevalent use of synthesizers, "You Can Go" is sometimes incorrectly connected to an advertisement in the early 1980s for Commodore 64, which used the Bach Invention played by a synthesizer. Also, the song "Falling Down" from his album Count the Cost is based on a sonata by Mozart.

Meece was requested to appear in Billy Graham crusades, among other outreach groups and television broadcasts. He was inducted into the Christian Music Hall of Fame on June 14, 2008, and received the 2009 Visionary Award for the Inspirational Male Soloist category.

In 2012, Meece co-wrote the piece "Hands of Hope", with fellow performers David L. Cook and Bruce Carroll. The song was a current day remake of "We Are the World", which featured many famous voices from the music industry. The song was recorded by the Charlotte Civic Orchestra and featured the voices of: Babbie Mason, Christy Sutherland, Cook, Caroline Keller, Fantasia Barrino, Gayla Earlene, Joshua Cobb, Paul Zeaman, and many of the former PTL Club singers from Jim and Tammy Faye Bakker's show. The song was used as the theme song for Turning Point Centers for Domestic Violence. 

"Hands of Hope" reached No. 1 on the charts and remained there for two weeks. In May 2012, the National Academy of Television Arts and Sciences announced the song garnered Meece, Cook and Carroll an Emmy nomination for Best Arrangement/Composer of a Television Theme Song.

Discography 
 David (1976)
 I Just Call on You (1977)
 Everybody Needs a Little Help (1978)
 Are You Ready? (1980)
 Front Row (1982)
 Count the Cost (1983)
 7 (1985)
 Chronology (1986)
 Candle In The Rain (1987)
 Learning To Trust (1989)
 Once in a Lifetime (1993)
 Odyssey (1995)
 Send Down The Rain (1995) – unreleased
 There I Go Again (2002)
 David Meece: The Definitive Collection (2007)
 Hands of Hope (2012)
 The Ultimate Collection (2014)

References

External links 
  
TheBeginningsConcert.com - Reunion Concert Event.

1952 births
Living people
American performers of Christian music
Myrrh Records artists
People from Humble, Texas
People from Houston
People from Franklin, Tennessee
Peabody Institute alumni
Performers of contemporary Christian music